Walter John Kingdon (23 February 1939 – 6 September 2018), known as Johnny Kingdom, was an English wildlife filmmaker and photographer specialising in his local area of Exmoor in north Devon and west Somerset.

Early life
Before finding fame, Kingdom worked as an explosives expert, lumberjack, farmhand, quarryman, poacher and for over 50 years the gravedigger for his local parish.

Media career
Following a head injury sustained while driving a tractor in his job as a lumberjack, Kingdom spent some time convalescing and developed depression. To aid in his recovery, a friend lent him a video camera and suggested he film wildlife on Exmoor. This led to a career spanning 20 years, with series and documentaries being shown on a number of British television channels.

His 2006 series Johnny Kingdom: A Year on Exmoor was shown on BBC Two. The series coincided with the publication of his autobiography, Johnny Kingdom - A Wild Life on Exmoor. A follow-up series, Johnny's New Kingdom, documenting his project to create a wildlife haven 
on a  plot of land which he had purchased on Exmoor, was shown on BBC Two in 2008. Kingdom has also made several one-off programmes, including visits to Lapland and to the Scottish Highlands. In 2015 he presented a four-part series for ITV called Johnny Kingdom's Wild Exmoor.

In later years he regularly had a stall at Barnstaple Pannier Market from which he sold signed copies of his books, DVDs and photographs of wildlife.

Death
Kingdom died in September 2018 from injuries sustained in a digger accident on his land near Knowstone in North Devon. He was buried at St Mary's Parish Church, Bishop's Nympton, in a grave that he had dug.

References

External links
 Johnny Kingdom's Official website
 "Johnny Kingdom - A Year on Exmoor" DVD website

1939 births
2018 deaths
Accidental deaths in England
English documentary filmmakers
English television presenters
People from North Devon (district)